Jigarthanda is a cold beverage that is famous in the South Indian city of Madurai in Tamil Nadu, India. 
It translates to "cold liver" ("jigar" means "liver" in Hindi, "thanda" means "cold" in Hindi) in English, implying that the drink’s cooling effect will felt right down to one’s liver. It is generally prepared and served at roadside stalls as a refreshment during the Indian summer. The basic ingredients include milk, almond gum, sarsaparilla root syrup, sugar and ice cream.

See also
 List of Indian beverages

References

Indian drinks
Madurai